is a Japanese sailor. He competed in the Tornado event at the 1988 Summer Olympics.

References

External links
 

1961 births
Living people
Japanese male sailors (sport)
Olympic sailors of Japan
Sailors at the 1988 Summer Olympics – Tornado
Place of birth missing (living people)